Margaret Ferrier (born 10 September 1960) is a Scottish politician serving as Member of Parliament (MP) for Rutherglen and Hamilton West since 2019, and previously from 2015 to 2017. As the candidate for the Scottish National Party (SNP), Ferrier was first elected to the House of Commons in the 2015 general election. She lost her seat to Ged Killen of the Labour Party at the 2017 general election but regained it two years later.

On 1 October 2020, Ferrier was suspended by the SNP for breaching COVID-19 lockdown rules; the party leader and Scottish First Minister, Nicola Sturgeon called on her to resign her parliamentary seat. She was arrested on 4 January 2021 and charged with "culpable and reckless conduct", for which she pleaded guilty and was later sentenced to community service.

Life and career

Early life and career
Ferrier was born on 10 September 1960 and brought up in the King's Park district of Glasgow, attending Holyrood Secondary School. After living with her family in Mallorca for two years, she moved to Rutherglen from 1972 to 1990 and then resided in Darnley. She has lived in the Halfway district of Cambuslang since 2000, where she joined the Rutherglen branch of the SNP in 2011 (in her youth she had been a Scottish Labour member).

Before her election to Parliament, she was a commercial sales supervisor for a manufacturing construction company in Motherwell.

Political career
Prior to her successful election to Westminster, she had previously been a defeated candidate for the Rutherglen South ward of South Lanarkshire Council in a 2013 by-election (following the death of Cllr Anne Higgins). The councillor voted in ahead of her on that occasion was Ged Killen of Scottish Labour.

She became the Member of Parliament (MP) for Rutherglen and Hamilton West after winning the seat at the 2015 United Kingdom general election; she achieved 30,279 votes, 52% of the total cast and a 31% swing from the previous incumbent and their party. She was the first female MP, and the first for the SNP, to be elected in the Rutherglen/Cambuslang portion of the constituency or its predecessor; Winnie Ewing had previously served a short spell as representative of the original Hamilton constituency for the same party.

Ferrier narrowly lost the seat in the June 2017 election to Ged Killen by 265 votes. In May 2019, Ferrier stood as a candidate in the European Union elections.

She was again selected as the SNP candidate for the seat in the 2019 Election, where she defeated Killen on a 5% swing and gained a majority of 5,240 votes or 9.7%.

Breaches of COVID-19 regulations

On 1 October 2020, Ferrier made a public statement apologising for serious breaches of COVID-19 regulations. Five days earlier, she first noted symptoms of COVID-19 and took a test, then visited a gym, beauty salon and a gift shop. While waiting for the results, having COVID-19 symptoms, Ferrier took a train from Scotland to London, on 28 September, and spoke in a parliamentary debate that evening. The same evening, she received a positive test result, but returned to Scotland the next morning, again by train, having told her party whip that a family member was unwell. Following her public statement, Ferrier was suspended from the SNP, and referred herself to the police and the Parliamentary standards authorities.

SNP leader and Scottish First Minister Nicola Sturgeon said on 2 October that Ferrier had been guilty of the "worst breach imaginable". Sturgeon said she had told Ferrier that she should step down as an MP. Sir Lindsay Hoyle, the Speaker of the House of Commons, described her actions as "reckless". The Scotsmans Gary Flockhart criticised Ferrier for hypocrisy in calling for government advisor Dominic Cummings to resign after he travelled to County Durham during the national lockdown before being found to have broken the rules herself. Ferrier said that the coronavirus made her act "out of character", an explanation that was dismissed by Sturgeon.

In October 2020, Ferrier's Rutherglen constituency association announced that they had asked her to resign her seat over the scandal, which she refused. In the same month, the Metropolitan Police said they would be taking no further action into the matter.

On 12 November 2020, Ferrier made her first appearance in the Commons since breaching COVID-19 regulations. In view of the circumstances, Richard Leonard, the then Leader of Scottish Labour, described the appearance as "a gross insult to her constituents." He accused her of gross selfishness and started a petition for her resignation from parliament.

On 4 January 2021, Ferrier was arrested and charged by Police Scotland with "culpable and reckless conduct." On 3 February 2021 she appeared at Glasgow Sheriff Court; no plea or declaration was made and she was given bail. She pled guilty to the charge on 18 August 2022, and on 13 September was sentenced to 270 hours of community service.

Personal life
Ferrier lives in Halfway, South Lanarkshire with her daughter.

References

External links 

 Personal website
 profile on SNP website

 
Margaret Ferrier 'MP Costs' at IPSA



1960 births
21st-century Scottish women politicians
21st-century Scottish politicians
Female members of the Parliament of the United Kingdom for Scottish constituencies
Living people
Scottish National Party MPs
People from Cambuslang
People from Rutherglen
People educated at Holyrood Secondary School
Scottish expatriates in Spain
Politicians from Glasgow
UK MPs 2015–2017
UK MPs 2019–present
COVID-19 pandemic in Scotland
Independent members of the House of Commons of the United Kingdom
Politicians from South Lanarkshire
Politicians affected by a party expulsion process
Scottish politicians convicted of crimes